Jeremiah Sirles (born August 8, 1991) is a former American football guard. He played college football at the University of Nebraska–Lincoln and attended Bear Creek High School in Lakewood, Colorado. He played in the NFL as a member of the San Diego Chargers, Minnesota Vikings, Carolina Panthers, and Buffalo Bills.

Early years
Sirles played high school football for the Bear Creek High School Bears. He was named to the Rocky Mountain News' All-Colorado squad his junior and senior years. He also earned first-team All-Colorado and all-conference honors as a junior, helping his team reach the state quarterfinals. As a sophomore, Sirles helped Bear Creek to the state quarterfinals, garnering first-team All-South Metro League and second-team all-state honors. He also participated in basketball and track & field at Bear Creek, helping his team to the state basketball tournament his senior year.

College career
Sirles played for the Nebraska Cornhuskers from 2010 to 2013. He was redshirted in 2009. He played in 53 games, starting 41 for the Cornhuskers. He was the 2013 recipient of the Cornhuskers' Guy Chamberlin Award. Sirles also earned honorable mention All-Big Ten honors as a senior and second-team All-Big Ten as a junior, along with Academic All-Big Ten honors his senior year.

Professional career

San Diego Chargers
Sirles signed with the San Diego Chargers on May 10, 2014 after going undrafted in the 2014 NFL Draft. He was signed to the Chargers' practice squad on August 31, 2014. He was promoted to the active roster on November 29, 2014. Sirles made his NFL debut on December 20, 2014 against the San Francisco 49ers filling in as guard for an injured Johnnie Troutman. He made his first career start at right guard on December 28, 2014 against the Kansas City Chiefs.

Minnesota Vikings
Sirles was traded to the Minnesota Vikings on September 5, 2015 for a sixth-round pick in the 2016 NFL Draft.

2016 season
In the 22-10 upset at Carolina in Week 3, Sirles played the final 39 minutes at left guard when Alex Boone went down because of a hip injury. The following week, Sirles stepped in at right tackle after Andre Smith went down with an elbow injury with eight minutes left in the first quarter. With Sirles on the field for the final 52 minutes, the Vikings scored 24 points, did not give up a sack, surpassed 100 yards rushing and scored their first two rushing touchdowns of the season. A week later, Sirles made his first start at right tackle in the Vikings' 31-13 win over the Houston Texans. He was the highest graded Viking offensive lineman in the game according to Pro Football Focus.

2017 season
In 2017, Sirles played in 14 games as a backup guard and center, where he started four games in place of injured starters Nick Easton and Pat Elflein.

Carolina Panthers
On March 23, 2018, Sirles signed a one-year contract with the Carolina Panthers, reuniting with former Vikings offensive coordinator Norv Turner. He was placed on injured reserve on September 1, 2018. He was released on September 6, 2018.

Buffalo Bills
On September 25, 2018, Sirles was signed by the Buffalo Bills.

On January 16, 2019, Sirles signed a one-year contract extension with the Bills. He was placed on injured reserve on July 23, 2019 with a foot injury. He was released on July 31, 2019.

Retirement
Sirles announced his retirement on March 2, 2020.

References

External links
College stats at Sports-Reference

Living people
1991 births
Players of American football from Colorado
People from Lakewood, Colorado
American football offensive tackles
American football offensive guards
Nebraska Cornhuskers football players
San Diego Chargers players
Minnesota Vikings players
Carolina Panthers players
Buffalo Bills players